The 1922 Portsmouth South by-election was held on 13 December 1922.  The by-election was held due to the resignation of the incumbent Conservative MP, Herbert Cayzer.  It was won by the Conservative candidate Leslie Orme Wilson.

Result

References

1922 in England
Elections in Portsmouth
1922 elections in the United Kingdom
By-elections to the Parliament of the United Kingdom in Hampshire constituencies
20th century in Hampshire